PSID or Psid may stand for:
Pounds per square inch differential
the Panel Study of Income Dynamics, a long term survey of a set of households in the United States
PSID64, a player for SID music
Provider Service Identifier, a concept used in the family of Wireless Access in Vehicular Environments standards.
Physical Security ID, an ID present on some SSDs, required for securely erasing them